Mathew Anthony Hudson (born 29 July 1998) is an English professional footballer who plays as a goalkeeper for Oldham Athletic. He started his career at Preston North End in 2015, and has had loan spells at Bury and Bamber Bridge.

Early life
Hudson was born in Southport.

Career
Having come through the club's academy, Hudson first appeared on the bench for Preston North End in early 2015 in an FA Cup fourth-round tie against Sheffield United, and made his professional debut aged 17 as a replacement for future England goalkeeper Jordan Pickford who was sent off in the 30th minute of a 1–0 away defeat at Leeds United on 20 December 2015. Leeds scored the only goal of the game through an Alan Browne own goal in the 46th minute, while Pickford's red card was later rescinded. Hudson signed his first professional contract in January 2016, with the deal lasting 18 months and having the option for a further year. He won Preston's scholar of the year award for the 2015–16 season.

He did not make a first-team appearance during the 2016–17 or 2017–18 seasons, but agreed a new two-year deal with the club in June 2018, and joined League Two side Bury on loan until January the following month. He made his debut for the club on 4 September 2020 in a defeat away to Rochdale in the EFL Trophy, and made a total of four appearances for Bury, all of which coming in the EFL Trophy.

With Hudson contract set to expire in summer 2020, it was extended by two years in June 2020. On 23 October 2020, he joined Bamber Bridge on loan alongside teammate Adam O'Reilly, until 28 November 2020. He made his debut for the club the following day in a 2–1 defeat at home to Bamber Bridge, he didn’t play anymore games for the club. . Hudson was released at the end of his contract in June 2022.

In December 2022, Hudson joined National League club Oldham Athletic following a spell with Buxton.

Career statistics

References

1998 births
Living people
Footballers from Southport
English footballers
Association football goalkeepers
Preston North End F.C. players
Bury F.C. players
Bamber Bridge F.C. players
Buxton F.C. players
Oldham Athletic A.F.C. players
English Football League players
Northern Premier League players